William Kinrade (1769-1854) was a renowned writer of Manx carols who lived at Ballachrink, Maughold, in the Isle of Man.

Kinrade is one of the most significant writers of Manx carols (or ‘carvels’), in an era when these are now considered to be the only surviving source of literature in Manx. To him have been attributed a number of carvels, including the following:

 Lhig da’n slane seihll cur clashtyn / Let the whole world harken
 O uss vriw bioee as merriu  / Thou judge of living and dead
 The Question-and-Answer carol.
 The Carol of Warning and Example to Young Men
 She corrym rish yn earish shoh
 Cre'n stayd va dooinney hoshiaght
 Carval Noah / Noah's Carol
 Carval Susannah / Susannah's Carol

The majority of these carvels were most notably published in Carvalyn Gailkagh (Manx Carols) by A. W. Moore in 1891. However, ‘Lhig da’n slane seihll cur clashtyn‘ (‘Let the whole world harken’) had been published earlier, in 1870. It is believed that this carvel was sung to the tune of ‘Mish ta’n Billey Roauyr,’ as the tune's title appears to be a corruption of the first line of the second verse: ‘T’eh mysh ny biljyn reurey‘ (‘He is digging about the trees’).

A translation of Kinrade's poetry has most recently appeared in Manannan’s Cloak: An Anthology of Manx Literature by Robert Corteen Carswell:

Notes

References
'Manx Carvels and Their Writers' by P. W. Caine, in Mannin, Vol. I No. 2, November 1913
'Manx Carols and Their Writers' by P. W. Caine, in Proceedings of the Isle of Man Natural History and Antiquarian Society, Vol. II No. 4, 1926
Mannanan’s Cloak: An Anthology of Manx Literature by Robert Corteen Carswell, London: Francis Boutle Publishers, 2010
'Manx Carvals and Carval Books, with Notes and some of the MSS' by Cryil I. Paton, in Proceedings of the Isle of Man Natural History and Antiquarian Society, Vol. II No. 4, 1926

External links
 Carvalyn Gailkagh by A. W. Moore, Douglas: John Christian Fargher, 1891

Manx poets
Manx literature
1769 births
1854 deaths